On May 1, 1971, there were 26 railroads in the United States that were eligible to participate in the formation of Amtrak. Twenty chose to join Amtrak in 1971, and one more eventually joined in 1979. Of the remaining five, four ultimately discontinued their services, while one was taken over by a state agency.

Participating railroads
Twenty railroads opted to participate. Each contributed rolling stock, equipment, and financial capital to the new government-sponsored entity. In return, the railroads received the right to discontinue intercity passenger rail services; most received tax breaks, while some received common stock in Amtrak. The four railroads that accepted stock were the Burlington Northern Railroad, the Grand Trunk Western Railroad, the Chicago, Milwaukee, St. Paul and Pacific Railroad ("Milwaukee Road"), and Penn Central. Because Amtrak discontinued many passenger rail routes when it commenced operations, some of the participating railroads did not host successor passenger rail service. The twenty participating railroads were:

 Atchison, Topeka and Santa Fe Railway
 Baltimore and Ohio Railroad (hosted no Amtrak service until the West Virginian later in 1971)
 Burlington Northern Railroad
 Central of Georgia Railway (never hosted Amtrak)
 Chesapeake and Ohio Railway
 Chicago, Milwaukee, St. Paul and Pacific Railroad
 Chicago and North Western Railway (never hosted Amtrak)
 Delaware and Hudson Railway (hosted no Amtrak service until the Adirondack in 1974)
 Grand Trunk Western Railroad (hosted no Amtrak service until the Blue Water Limited in 1974)
 Gulf, Mobile and Ohio Railroad

 Illinois Central Railroad
 Louisville and Nashville Railroad
 Missouri Pacific Railroad
 Norfolk and Western Railway (hosted no Amtrak service until the Mountaineer in 1975)
 Northwestern Pacific Railroad (never hosted Amtrak service)
 Penn Central Transportation (whose Northeast Corridor Amtrak acquired the majority of in 1976)
 Richmond, Fredericksburg and Potomac Railroad
 Seaboard Coast Line Railroad
 Southern Pacific Railroad
 Union Pacific Railroad

Non-participating railroads
There were six railroads eligible to participate in the formation of Amtrak that declined to spin off their passenger rail services. The intercity passenger operations of those six railroads eventually were absorbed by Amtrak or another governmental entity, or discontinued. The six non-participating railroads and disposition of their routes were as follows:

 The Chicago, Rock Island and Pacific Railroad continued to receive subsidies from the state of Illinois. It discontinued its two remaining intercity passenger trains, the  Peoria Rocket and Quad Cities Rocket, on December 31, 1978.
 The Chicago South Shore and South Bend Railroad continued to operate service. Public funding for its commuter-oriented trains began in 1977, with the Northern Indiana Commuter Transportation District fully taking over the South Shore Line in 1989.
 The Denver and Rio Grande Western Railroad feared congestion from hosting a revived California Zephyr on its single-track mainline. It operated its last Rio Grande Zephyr in 1983, and Amtrak's San Francisco Zephyr was renamed the California Zephyr.

 The Georgia Railroad received tax benefits from the state of Georgia so long as it ran mixed trains. The Seaboard System Railroad, its successor, discontinued the last mixed train on May 6, 1983.
 The Reading Company determined that its Philadelphia–Newark service was outside Amtrak's scope. It was later operated by Conrail and NJ Transit, who discontinued it in 1982.
 The Southern Railway did not join until February 1, 1979, at which point it conveyed its Southern Crescent to Amtrak.

Ineligible railroads
A few major railroads with operations in the United States were not eligible to participate in the formation of Amtrak:

The Alaska Railroad provided long-distance service, but was already owned by the United States government.
The Canadian Pacific's Atlantic, though it crossed northern Maine, was considered a Canada-centric service not relevant to Amtrak. It was taken over by Via Rail in 1978 and ran until 1994. Until 1977, a Canadian National Railway Winnipeg–Thunder Bay local service also crossed part of northern Minnesota. 
The Erie Lackawanna's Hoboken-Port Jervis service was considered an ineligible commuter service; in 1973, the Metropolitan Transportation Authority began subsidizing continued operation.

The Florida East Coast discontinued its last passenger service in 1968, leaving the FEC ineligible to join Amtrak. Passenger services resumed under the purview of privately-owned Brightline in 2018.
The Kansas City Southern Railway, having discontinued its Southern Belle in 1969, had no remaining passenger service despite its size.
The Soo Line Railroad was permitted to discontinue regular passenger services in the 1960s in exchange for allowing passengers to ride in cabooses on freights between Sault Ste. Marie, Michigan, Rhinelander, Wisconsin, and Neenah, Wisconsin. The mixed trains lasted until 1986, making the Soo Line the last Class I railroad in the continental United States with non-subsidized passenger service.
The Western Pacific Railroad discontinued the California Zephyr in 1970, ending passenger service on its route. It refused to discuss resumption of service with Amtrak.

Notes

References
 
 
 
 
 

Amtrak
Amtrak, Railroads eligible
Amtrak, Railroads eligible
Amtrak, Railroads eligible